Brooke Grossman (born September 25, 1978) is an American politician who is a member for the Maryland House of Delegates in District 2B in Washington County.

Career
Grossman graduated from Brunswick High School and attended Kaplan University, where she earned a B.S. degree in human service administration in 2016. She currently works as the chief mission officer for Horizon Goodwill Industries and chairs the county's homeless coalition.

In May 2018, the Washington County Board of Commissioners appointed Grossman to a three-year term as a citizen at-large representative to its Emergency Services Advisory Council.

In 2020, Grossman unsuccessfully ran for in the Hagerstown City Council, placing seventh with 8.7 percent of the vote.

In 2022, Grossman ran for the Maryland House of Delegates in District 2B, challenging incumbent state delegate Brenda J. Thiam. She won the Democratic primary on July 19, 2022, receiving 61.3 percent of the vote, and later defeated Thiam in the general election on November 8.

In the legislature
Grossman was sworn into the Maryland House of Delegates on January 11, 2023. She is a member of the House Ways and Means Committee.

Personal life
Grossman lives in southern Hagerstown.

Political positions
In January 2022, Grossman requested that the Washington County Board of Commissioners provide $10,000 in funding from the American Rescue Plan Act of 2021 to help with the costs of quarantining COVID-19 positive homeless people. The motion for the request was approved 4-0 by the Board of Commissioners.

In February 2022, Grossman criticized a petition released by state delegate Brenda J. Thiam against the newly drawn legislative redistricting maps.

In May 2022, Grossman signed a Chesapeake Climate Action Network resolution to move Maryland to 100 percent carbon-free electricity by 2035 and to remove trash incineration from the state's "clean energy" classification.

Electoral history

References

External links
 

21st-century American politicians
1978 births
Democratic Party members of the Maryland House of Delegates
Living people
Purdue University alumni
People from Hagerstown, Maryland
Women state legislators in Maryland
Politicians from Hagerstown, Maryland
21st-century American women politicians